The 28th Senate District of Wisconsin is one of 33 districts in the Wisconsin State Senate.  Located in southeast Wisconsin, the district comprises southwest Milwaukee County, southern Waukesha County, northwest Racine County, and northeast Walworth County.  It includes all of the city of Muskego, as well as most of the cities of Greenfield and Franklin, and the villages of East Troy, Eagle, Greendale, Hales Corners, Mukwonago, and Waterford.

Current elected officials
Julian Bradley is the senator representing the 28th district. He was first elected in the 2020 general election.

Each Wisconsin State Senate district is composed of three Wisconsin State Assembly districts.  The 28th Senate district comprises the 82nd, 83rd, and 84th Assembly districts.  The current representatives of those districts are:
 Assembly District 82: Chuck Wichgers (R–Muskego)
 Assembly District 83: Nik Rettinger (R–Mukwonago)
 Assembly District 84: Bob Donovan (R–Greenfield)

The district is located almost entirely within Wisconsin's 1st congressional district, which is represented by U.S. Representative Bryan Steil.  The exception is the portion of the district in the city of Greenfield and much of the city of New Berlin, which fall within Wisconsin's 5th congressional district, represented by U.S. Representative Glenn Grothman.

History
The boundaries of districts have changed over history. Previous politicians of a specific numbered district often represented a different geographic area, due to redistricting.

The 28th District was created in 1856, when the Senate was expanded from 25 to 30 members. At that time, it consisted of Burnett, Chippewa, Clark, Dallas (later renamed Barron), Douglas, Dunn County, La Pointe (later renamed Bayfield), Pepin, Pierce, Polk, and St. Croix Counties.

The first Senator from the 28th was William Wilson of Menomonie, who served in the 1857 session (the tenth session of the Wisconsin Legislature).  As of the redistricting of 1861, the 28th now consisted of Ashland, Burnett, Dallas (later renamed Barron), Douglas, La Pointe (later renamed Bayfield), Pierce, Polk, and St. Croix counties (it was not changed in the redistricting of 1866).

The district was entirely changed for the 1871 election, being changed into one consisting of Crawford and Richland counties.  In 1876, the district was changed again: it dropped Crawford County, and would instead consist of Iowa and Richland counties for many years.

An 1892 special session of the legislature declared that, The counties of Iowa and Lafayette and the towns of Cassvilla, Clifton, Ellenborough, Harrison, Hazel Green, Jamestown, Liberty, Lima, Paris, Platteville, Potosi, Smelser, Waterloo and Glen Haven in the county of Grant were now the 28th District.

The Legislature redistricted once again, and the 28th would consist of Crawford County, Wisconsin, Richland and Vernon counties for two terms.  In the 1901 session of the legislature, another redistricting removed Crawford County from the district.  The 1911 redistricting completely changed the district boundaries, moving it to Chippewa and Eau Claire counties—these boundaries would remain consistent for the next fifty years.

In May 1964, the Wisconsin Supreme Court ordered a complete redistricting and re-numbering of all Wisconsin Senate districts.  As a result, the 28th, which had historically been a northern and western Wisconsin district, was now a district consisting of portions of Milwaukee County (villages of Greendale and Hales Corners; and the cities of Franklin and Greenfield); Racine County (towns of Burlington, Caledonia, Dover, Norway, Raymond, Rochester, Waterford and Yorkville; the villages of Rochester, Union Grove and Waterford; and the city of Burlington); and Waukesha County (towns of Eagle, Mukwonago, Muskego, Ottawa, Summit and Vernon; the villages of Big Bend, Dousman, Eagle, Mukwongo and Oconomowoc Lake; and the city of New Berlin).  Since 1964, the district has remained in the same general vicinity, at the meeting point between southwest Milwaukee County, southeast Waukesha County, northwest Racine County, and northeast Walworth County, with slight variations in boundaries between those four counties.

Past senators
Previous senators include:

References

External links
District Website
Senator Lazich's Website

Wisconsin State Senate districts
Milwaukee County, Wisconsin
Racine County, Wisconsin
Walworth County, Wisconsin
Waukesha County, Wisconsin
1856 establishments in Wisconsin